The Committee of Selection (Malay: Jawantankuasa Pemilih; ; Tamil: மலேசிய மன்றத்தின் லார்ட்ஸ் தேர்வு குழு) is a select committee of the Senate in the Parliament of Malaysia. The committee carries out responsibilities stipulated by the Standing Orders. Members are elected at the beginning of each session.

Membership

14th Parliament
As of January 2019, the committee's membership was as follows:

13th Parliament

12th Parliament

11th Parliament

10th Parliament

9th Parliament

8th Parliament

7th Parliament

6th Parliament

5th Parliament

4th Parliament

3rd Parliament

2nd Parliament

1st Parliament

See also
Parliamentary Committees of Malaysia

References

External links
COMMITTEE OF SELECTION - SENATE

Parliament of Malaysia
Committees of the Parliament of Malaysia
Committees of the Dewan Negara